Kamal Najamuddin (born 24 October 1954) is a former Pakistani cricketer who played first-class cricket for several teams in Pakistan from 1970 to 1987.

Kamal Najamuddin was a wicket-keeper who usually opened the batting. He played a first-class match in 1969-70 at the age of 15 purely as a batsman, and another in 1970-71 as a wicket-keeper, without batting in either. In his second match of the 1971-72 season, opening and keeping wicket for Karachi Whites, he made 45 and 107 not out.

He continued to play for various Karachi teams and Sindh. He had his best season with the bat in 1980-81, when in nine matches he made 645 runs at an average of 40.31, with two centuries. He made his highest score of 179 for Karachi against Railways, when he put on 418 for the first wicket with Khalid Alvi.

In 1982-83 he made 10 dismissals (nine caught, one stumped) in Karachi's victory over Lahore City. In 1983-84 he played only three matches, all for Karachi Greens, but he made 86, 111 not out, 108 not out, 69 and 0.

References

External links
 Kamal Najamuddin at CricketArchive
 

1954 births
Living people
Pakistani cricketers
Karachi cricketers
National Bank of Pakistan cricketers
Sindh cricketers
Cricketers from Karachi